The Appeared is a 2007 Spanish-language horror film with thriller and road movie elements directed and written by Paco Cabezas. The movie had its world premiere on October 5, 2007 at the Sitges Film Festival and stars Ruth Díaz and Javier Pereira as two siblings in a journey across the Argentine Patagonia caught up in a horrific series of events.

Synopsis
Siblings Malena and Pablo have decided to set out on a road trip to allow Pablo to discover more about their father, who is on life support. Their destination is the old family home in Argentina and initially the trip is fairly mundane. This all changes when Pablo discovers an old journal hidden within their car. The journal details a series of gruesome crimes and Pablo pushes for the two of them to travel to the various landmarks and places described in the journal while they are on their road trip. They end up stopping for the night at a hotel detailed in the journal, where the Leonardi family was brutally slaughtered. Pablo and Malena take the room adjacent to the room the Leonardis met their deaths and are horrified to overhear a spiritual reenactment of the murders. The siblings decide to flee but Pablo forgets the book and must return to retrieve it. This nearly ends with Pablo's death and when he has reached safety Pablo notices that some of the details in the book have changed, making him wonder if it is possible for him to change the past. However, as they travel Pablo finds that his quest to discover more about his father is bringing both siblings revelations that they are ill-prepared to deal with.

Cast

Release 
The film was presented at the 40th Sitges Film Festival in October 2007. The theatrical release in Spain was set, after several delays, to December 12, 2008, whereas the theatrical release in Argentina was scheduled for December 3, 2009.

Reception
Las Horas Perdidas gave a positive review for The Appeared and cited Ruth Díaz's acting as one of the film's highlights. HorrorNews.net also gave a favorable review and wrote that "Various plot twists keep the storyline alive, as the movie’s length of 120 minutes seems long but fitting for the story to develop in a shocking fashion." Den of Geek was more mixed in their review and commented that "Overall, it is a good effort, but with the obvious downfalls, and is hurt by one of the cheesiest endings I have ever witnessed. Still, it's definitely worth a watch, and while it's not a groundbreaking movie in any sense, it certainly has its moments." Nuria Vidal of Fotogramas scored 3 out of 5 stars, highlighting the setting where the film takes place as the best thing about it, likewise pointing out at the overly predictable plot outcome as the worst thing about it.

See also 
 List of Spanish films of 2008
 List of Argentine films of 2009

References

External links
 The Appeared at ICAA's Catálogo de Cinespañol
 

2007 films
2007 horror films
2000s Spanish-language films
Spanish horror films
Films set in Argentina
Films directed by Paco Cabezas
Films set in 2001
2000s Spanish films
Argentine horror films
2000s Argentine films